Kastamonu District (also: Merkez, meaning "central") is a district of the Kastamonu Province of Turkey. Its seat is the city of Kastamonu. Its area is 1,847 km2, and its population is 152,541 (2021).

Composition
There is one municipality in Kastamonu District:
 Kastamonu

There are 177 villages in Kastamonu District:

 Ahlatçık
 Ahlatköy
 Ahmetbey
 Akçakese
 Akçataş
 Akdoğan
 Aksinir
 Alçıcılar
 Alpağut
 Alparslan
 Alpı
 Arız
 Aşağıakça
 Aşağıbatak
 Aşağıelyakut
 Aşağıyuva
 Ayvalar
 Bahadır
 Ballık
 Baltacı
 Baltacıkuyucağı
 Başköy
 Başören
 Bayındır
 Bostanköy
 Bozoğlak
 Bükköy
 Bulacık
 Burhanlı
 Bürme
 Çakıllı
 Cambaz
 Çatalçam
 Çatören
 Çavundur, Kastamonu
 Çavundur, Kuzyaka
 Cebeci
 Çerçiköy
 Çevreli
 Çıbanköy
 Çiğil
 Civciler
 Çorumlu
 Damlaçay
 Darıbükü
 Dayılar
 Demirci
 Dereberçin
 Dereköy
 Dokuzkat
 Dursunlar
 Duruçay
 Eceoğlu
 Elmayakası
 Emirköy
 Emirler, Kastamonu
 Emirler, Kuzyaka
 Emirli
 Eşen
 Esenler
 Esenli
 Etyemez
 Evciler
 Eymir
 Gelinören
 Geyikli
 Girdallı
 Göcen
 Gödel
 Gökçekent
 Gökçukur
 Gölköy
 Gömeç
 Gömmece
 Gülef
 Hacıbey
 Hacıilyas
 Hacıköy
 Hacımuharrem
 Hacışaban
 Hacıyusuf
 Halaçlı
 Halife
 Halifekuyucağı
 Hamitköy
 Hasköy
 Hatipköy
 Hatipli
 Hatipoğlu
 Haydarlar
 Hocaköy
 Hüseyinli
 İbişler
 İbrahimli
 İmamköy
 İnceboğaz
 İslamköy
 İsmailli, Akkaya
 İsmailli, Kuzyaka
 Kadıoğlu
 Karaçomak
 Karaevli
 Karakuz
 Karamukmolla
 Karaş
 Kasaba
 Kasabaörencik
 Kaşçılar
 Kavakköy
 Kavalca
 Kayalı
 Kayı
 Kemerler
 Keremli
 Kırcalar
 Kirenli
 Kırık
 Kırışoğlu
 Kıyık, Kastamonu
 Kıyık, Kuzyaka
 Kızılkese
 Köklü
 Konukça
 Koruköy
 Köseoğlu
 Küçüksu
 Kurtgömeç
 Kurtkayı
 Kurucaören
 Kurusayar
 Kuşkara
 Kuzyaka
 Mescitköy
 Mollaköy
 Musallar
 Nalcıkuyucağı
 Numanlar
 Obruk
 Oğulköy
 Omcular
 Ömerli
 Örencik
 Örenyeri
 Ortaboğaz
 Ortaköy
 Pehlivanköy
 Sada
 Sahip
 Sapaca
 Saraycık
 Sarıca
 Sarıömer
 Seremettin
 Şeyhköy
 Sipahi
 Sırasöğütler
 Subaşı
 Sulusökü
 Talipler
 Tarlatepe
 Taşlık
 Tekkeköy
 Tepeharman
 Terziköy
 Ümit
 Üyücek
 Uzunoluk
 Yaka
 Yarören
 Yenikavak
 Yılancı
 Yolkonak
 Yukarıbatak
 Yukarıelyakut
 Yukarıkuyucak
 Yunusköy
 Yürekveren

References

Districts of Kastamonu Province